The Achan Subdivision is a short railroad line operated by CSX Transportation located in Polk County, Florida in a region known as the Bone Valley.  The seven-mile line runs from a wye with the Valrico Subdivision in Mulberry south to the Brewster Subdivision in Bradley Junction.  It also crosses the Bone Valley Subdivision in Achan.

History

The Achan Subdivision was built around 1912 as the northernmost extension of the Charlotte Harbor and Northern Railway, which extended from Bradley Junction south to Boca Grande on Gasparilla Island.  The extension north to Mulberry allowed the Charlotte Harbor and Northern to serve more phosphate facilities in Mulberry.  It also served the now defunct town of Pierce, a town built to house workers of the American Agricultural Chemicals Company, which built and owned the Charlotte Harbor and Northern Railway.  Pierce was also the location of a phosphate drying plant.

The Seaboard Air Line Railroad bought the Charlotte Harbor and Northern Railway in 1926.  The Seaboard Air Line then designated the segment from Mulberry to Bradley Junction and from there to Agricola as the Agricola Subdivision.  That line east of Bradley Junction also had a spur to Hooker's Prairie Phosphate Mine.  In 1967, the Seaboard Air Line and the Atlantic Coast Line merged to form the Seaboard Coast Line Railroad.  The line became the Achan Subdivision in the Seaboard Coast Line era, with the segment to Agricola being downgraded to spur status.

In 1980, the Seaboard Coast Line's parent company merged with the Chessie System, creating the CSX Corporation.  The CSX Corporation initially operated the Chessie and Seaboard Systems separately until 1986, when they were merged into CSX Transportation.

References

CSX Transportation lines
Rail infrastructure in Florida
Transportation in Polk County, Florida